Carolyn Mary King  is a New Zealand zoologist specialising in mammals, particularly  small rodents and mustelids. She is currently a professor of biological sciences at the University of Waikato.

Career
King got her first PhD in Zoology from the University of Oxford entitled 'Studies on the ecology of the weasel (Mustela nivalis L.)' studying under ornithologist Henry Neville Southern, before moving to DSIR's Ecology Division and from there to the University of Waikato, where she rose to full professor.

She won the New Zealand Ecology Society Te Tohu Taiao Award for Ecological Excellence in 1999. In 2018, King was elected a Fellow of the Royal Society of New Zealand.

She received her second PhD (this time in theology) from the University of Waikato entitled: 'Habitat of Grace - Biology, Christianity and the Global Environmental Crisis'.

Selected works

References

External links
 
 institutional homepage

Living people
New Zealand women academics
20th-century New Zealand zoologists
Alumni of the University of Oxford
Academic staff of the University of Waikato
People associated with Department of Scientific and Industrial Research (New Zealand)
Mammalogists
Fellows of the Royal Society of New Zealand
Year of birth missing (living people)